Noel Conway may refer to:

 Noel Conway (priest), Catholic priest of the Diocese of Down and Connor
 Noel Conway (Lecturer), Assisted dying advocate